James Cook, known as Cook, to his friends, is a fictional character in the British teen drama Skins. He is portrayed by Jack O'Connell. In the third series, his true emotions are explored and it is revealed that his womanising violent lifestyle is in fact a smoke screen to cover up his real emotions. His actions often cause trouble and create havoc, affecting those around him. However, in the fourth series, he begins to change his ways after a conversation with his solicitor and when he begins to realise the consequences of his actions, most notably witnessing his younger brother beginning to follow in his footsteps. His life is then taken in a wholly other direction when he investigates the disappearance of his best friend in series four's final episodes.

Characterisation
Cook is an outgoing, sexually promiscuous, and in many ways self-destructive young man, who appears to have come from a troubled family background. He is an impulsive 17-year-old at the start of the series. He loves to have a good time and is constantly the life and soul of any party. Cook shows a great interest in the ladies, and all his partying can sometimes get out of hand, leading him into trouble. He loves to drink and use drugs, but whether or not he is an addict is left ambiguous to the viewers. Throughout the series, he is best friends with both Freddie and JJ, although at times, his sexual relationship with Effy Stonem drives a rift between them. Despite his self-destructive lifestyle, Cook is sometimes caring and kind-hearted - as seen in his fondness for JJ, and his kindness to Naomi and Pandora when they are in tough times.

Character history

Series 3
In "Everyone", Cook, Freddie and JJ meet Effy the morning before they start college, all instantly falling for her. During roll-call the first day, Cook flirts with Naomi, who ignores his attempts. Effy sets Cook and Freddie a challenge: whoever breaks the college rules gets to “know her better”. Cook breaks the rules, to the point of starting a fire. His reward is sex with Effy in the nurse's office.

In "Cook", Cook invites the gang to his uncle's pub to celebrate his seventeenth birthday which he believes will be a wild, drink-fueled event, but it backfires. The girls decide to leave after Pandora throws up. Cook persuades them otherwise, promising drugs. Freddie gets a call from his sister, Karen, who is at her friend Kayleigh's engagement party. Cook rounds the gang up and they head over there uninvited. Cook flirts with Kayleigh, and starts passing out drugs to his friends. He ends up angering Johnny White, Kayleigh's father and a Bristol drug lord. Cook gets beaten up and the rest of the gang leave with him. Cook then drags JJ to a brothel after an argument with Freddie. There they find Johnny White. Cook taunts and injures him. Johnny vows to kill Cook next time he sees him.

In "Pandora", Cook crashes Pandora's party and has sex with Effy in a closet. While they were having sex they fell back into Pandora's next-door neighbour's room., where they came across a video of Pandora's mum having sex with the next-door neighbour. Then, Pandora comes out of the bathroom upset, by which point Cook is the only other person in the house. When Pandora expresses unhappiness that she never got to do the activities she wanted that night - play Twister and learn about human sexuality from her friends - Cook offers to play the game with her out of pity. He then offers to have sex with her, and they spend a while together as the sun rises above Bristol. Effy visits Pandora the next morning, and sees Cook share a kiss with her as he leaves. After an argument, Pandora defiantly tells Effy that Cook, due to his promiscuity and impulsive, carnal behaviour, belongs to no one.

In "Freddie", Freddie gets tired of living in the shadow of the increasingly reckless Cook. Freddie is annoyed by Cook crashing his shed right when he is beginning to bond with Effy, and Effy rejects Cook's offer for sex. Cook and Freddie begin to patch their differences at a pub quiz, although JJ accidentally reveals that Cook slept with Freddie's sister Karen, which Freddie is horrified by. In retaliation for Karen stealing Freddie's shed, Cook convinced everybody at the pub to vote against Karen in the finals of talent show she is a contestant in, although Freddie is infuriated by this due to supporting Karen, and starts a fight with Cook. Although Freddie reveals his true feelings for Effy in the episode, which she reciprocates, she goes back to Cook because she's afraid to love anyone.

In "Naomi", Cook tries again to convince Naomi to have sex with him. She jokingly tells him that he has a better chance of winning the election for student body president. He sees this as a challenge, and registers as a candidate. She launches her own campaign to rival Cook, especially when his campaign turns out to be more about making a spectacle than any actual plans. Yet, their classmates seem to prefer Cook. Naomi is doubly humiliated in front of the form when Cook ridicules her and Emily subsequently stands up for her, and Cook jokes about Emily being her "girlfriend." Naomi later witnesses her teachers rigging the votes to prevent Cook from winning, and reveals this to the form after she is announced the winner of the elections. As his first presidential act, Cook starts a riot. In the ensuing chaos, Naomi forgives Cook and begins to have sex with him before she realises that it "isn't right". Cook doesn't make any attempts to force her, as he says she's "clever" enough to have a reason not to follow through. She leaves, with her and Cook now sharing a better understanding of each other.

In "JJ", JJ sees his mother, Celia, overwhelmed by all of his issues and blames himself. He calls Cook to tell him how he feels, but Cook is preoccupied with having sex with a girl who JJ assumes is Effy. However, when JJ, encouraged by Emily, goes to confront Effy, she reveals that she has not seen Cook in days. JJ then visits Cook and discovers that the girl he was having sex with was with Pandora. Pretending not to have seen this, he then confronts Cook about ruining their friendship with Freddie, and explodes in a violent rage when he realises Cook is indifferent to his feelings. Moved by this, Cook give JJ a hug and tells him that he loves him and brings JJ with him to buy drugs. They are almost arrested and, after running from the police, JJ pressures Cook into taking his prescription drugs, knowing they are designed both to make people relax and become more honest. They then meet their friends at a club. JJ and Cook arrive and Thomas Tomone (Merveille Lukeba) lets them into the club, announcing that Emily is already inside. Cook gets into a fight on the dance floor and Freddie moves in to help when he discovers that JJ gave Cook his prescription drugs. Cook, under the influence of JJ's drugs, is compelled to tell the truth and confesses that Effy loves Freddie. Cook says that he loves Effy, but knows his feelings are not reciprocated and that is why he is sleeping with Pandora.

In "Effy", Cook crashes the gang's camping trip, and in anger reveals many of the group's secrets, including the fact that he and Pandora are still sleeping together - which causes Thomas to break up with her. After Effy is ousted from the group, he decides to take her on a road trip, to get away from it all.

In "Finale", Cook and Effy are in self-imposed exile from the gang; they've gone to stay with Cook's father. They are found by JJ and Freddie, who try to bring them back, but soon realise that Cook is beginning to fall in love with Effy. Cook, Freddie and JJ take part in the town's annual steeple chase, the reward for them at the end being Effy, although Cook's father's boat is also part of a wager with another man entering the chase. Neither Cook nor Freddie win, the winner in fact being JJ, resulting in the loss of the boat and Effy. However, JJ chooses to pressure Effy to make a choice between the three boys; her gaze lingers on Freddie, causing Cook to leave in a fit of rage. Towards the end of the episode, Cook goes to his father's boat hoping to leave with him; his father tells him he never wanted him the first place, but Cook, sobbing, still angrily refuses to hand over the keys. His father, exasperated, pulls out a flare and threatens to burn Cook's face off, not caring whether Cook lives or dies, to which Cook replies, "I don't, either." Freddie arrives and knocks Cook's father unconscious before he can do any harm to Cook. Freddie asks Cook to say it's okay for him to be with Effy; Cook says he can't do it because he loves her, and he's sorry. JJ and Effy arrive, followed by the townspeople hoping to claim Cook's dad's boat. But Cook, JJ, Freddie and Effy quickly set sail. Cook's dad awakes to them setting sail, and upon realises that his boat is safe shouts "I'm Cook!" in an antagonistic manner at Cook and his friends. Cook then shouts back at his father, "No, I'm Cook!" and pushes him off the boat. As they sail away toward Bristol, the episode ends with Freddie asking, "So, what do we do now?"

Series 4
In "Thomas", The gang, excluding Effy, witness the suicide of a teenage girl, Sophia, after she had taken drugs. Depressed, Thomas gets drunk and attacks Cook after Cook taunts him about his infidelity with Pandora, still convinced that Cook sold Sophia the drugs. This leads to Naomi admitting that Cook gave her the drugs, which Naomi later gave to Sophia.

In "Emily", Emily learns that Naomi was dealing powder with Cook the night of the suicide and sold some to Sophia to pay for the motorbike goggles she bought her. Cook sees Effy and Freddie kissing at the party and takes his anger out on a fellow party-goer, severely beating him and ends up accidentally headbutting JJ also.

In "Cook", Cook is in prison, charged with Grievous Bodily Harm for beating up Shanky Jenkins at the house party. Duncan, Cook's legal aid, advises him to plead guilty, but Cook pleads not guilty instead. He is released from prison with an electronic tag and sent to live with his mother, Ruth, a famous artist. At home, Cook bonds with his younger brother Paddy who adores him, but clashes with his vain and perpetually drunken mother. Cook is expelled from college. He visits Naomi who informs him they must deal with their guilt over Sophia. Afterwards Duncan tells Cook there is no case and that he should grow up. Cook visits his mother's art exhibit and is shocked to learn that she had a brief sexual relationship with Freddie. Freddie admits Ruth gave him a blow job at Cook's 15th birthday party and pleads for Cook to stop acting out. Cook argues with his mother, leaves the house with Paddy and steals Ruth's car, trashing it. Cook has a moment of insight when he sees his brother acting like him. He finds Naomi and has a heart-to-heart, bonding over how they both love someone. He then goes back to his legal aid Duncan and has a breakdown. Afterwards he tells the police he sold Sophia the MDMA, taking the flak for Naomi. Effy visits Cook in prison and tells him she loves Freddie. Cook pleads guilty at trial and is imprisoned.

In "Freddie", after Freddie clears the party out, Cook remains, having apparently escaped from jail prior to the beginning of the episode, saying he couldn't stick being stuck with "a million me's anymore". However, when seeing him, Effy begins to freak out, yelling at him to leave. Later, Freddie tries to follow a freaked out Effy who ran away from him, but loses sight of her in the large crowd, however he runs into Cook and asks him for help. After Effy attempted suicide, Cook, despite his own feeling for Effy, tells Freddie not to give up on her.
 
In "Effy", she runs into Cook and after an argument, Cook tells her that he would redo the last two years all over again, and that he still loves her. Effy tells him to piss off and leaves. The next morning, she is at a park, and Cook sits on the bench next to her. As they are talking, Cook mentions that Freddie calls him about her (and calls her "Ef"). Effy looks confused, asking who "Ef" is. Cook then asks her what her name is, unsure whether she is joking or not to which she replies "Elizabeth". Cook then reintroduces himself as James. He takes her to a party, and they talk. Effy mentions that she normally doesn't go on a date with someone she just met. Cook goes along with it, not telling her that they have already met. As they walk down the street, they end up at the street where Tony got hit by a bus. Effy's memory begins to get jogged, and begins remembering. Cook, not understanding that Effy really didn't remember him, tells her that she wins (thinking it was a game). Effy is confused, but Cook tells her that they have met, dated, and had sex. Effy tries to deny it, but Cook brings up things only someone close to her would know. Effy finally remembers her brother being hit, but she begins to freak out. Cook slaps her to "wake" her up, and Effy wants him to do it again. After pushing Cook, she runs off, with him chasing her. She runs into the freeway and gets almost hit by a car. Cook saves her and she kisses him. Effy remembers everything and tells Cook to get her to Freddie. Cook brings Effy to Freddie and they talk about the relationship between all three of them, they argue when Cook realises Freddie was planning on leaving. He leaves telling Freddie not to screw it up.

In "Everyone", Karen and Cook start to become concerned about Freddie's whereabouts. Karen gives Cook Freddie's notebook which repeatedly says the words "I love her" regarding Effy, which causes him to visibly sob. Upon reading it again, he notices a part that says "John Foster wants to hurt her". The police then raid Naomi's house after Cook's ex-girlfriend Arcia tells the police where he is hiding. Cook escapes and goes to Freddie's shed where he meets Effy who has been released from the psychiatric hospital. The rest of the gang meet there and decide to throw a party for Freddie's birthday even though he isn't there. Cook heads outside briefly where he spots a figure observing Freddie's house. He decides to follow. Cook breaks into John's basement where he finds Freddie's blood stained clothes and shoes. Cook then seemingly hears Freddie's ghostly voice warning him to "get out" before Foster returns, this spooks Cook into turning on a light just as Foster arrives with his baseball bat. John hits him in the stomach almost knocking him to the ground and verbally taunts him. Cook gets up laughing, and admits he is a criminal and has no sense or impulse control, he then tells John that he knows he killed Freddie. As the season ends, he launches himself at Foster, screaming "I'm Cook!"

Series 7
In "Rise", Cook has been on the run for three years, and is now working as a drug dealer in Manchester, having all but abandoned his former life behind. When he is asked to help his employer's girlfriend find a house and finds that he is irresistibly attracted to her, he sets off a chain of events which will lead him into a world of savage revenge and a confrontation with his own teenage past. It was revealed in "Rise: Part 1" that Cook killed John Foster at the end of series 4 and has been on the run ever since. In "Rise: Part 2", Cook deals with his issues and makes a decision not to kill his employer, who at this point had killed his girlfriend, Emma, and threatened to kill Cook as well, but decides to be the bigger man and walk away.

External links
James Cook on the official E4 Skins site
James Cook Character Blog on E4 Skins site
James Cook on Myspace

Skins (British TV series) characters
Fictional English people
Fictional drug dealers
Fictional murderers
Fictional vigilantes
Television characters introduced in 2009
Fictional cannabis users
Fictional prison escapees
Teenage characters in television
Male characters in television
British male characters in television